Tiempo de amar (English title:Time to love) is a Mexican telenovela produced by Silvia Pinal for Televisa in 1987. It is an original story by Alberto Cura and directed by Rafael Banquells.

Lupita D'Alessio and Fernando Allende starred as protagonists.

Plot
This is the story of Carolina who falls for Luis Alberto and are happy for some time but she has an incurable disease that little by little leads to death, leaving behind a child.

Cast 
Lupita D'Alessio as Carolina Monteverde
Fernando Allende as Luis Alberto Carrasco
Kitty de Hoyos as Bárbara Ornelas
Claudio Obregón as Rafael Monteverde
Ernesto Laguardia as Héctor
Alejandra Ávalos as Marcela
Adriana Roel as Mercedes Monteverde
Dolores Beristáin as Lola
Alejandra Guzmán as Celia
Alfonso Iturralde as Carlos
Héctor Gómez as Dr. Adolfo Klauz
Eugenia Avendaño as Esperanza
Dina de Marco as Margot
Adriana Parra as Yolanda
Chela Nájera as Nadia Levison
Marcela López Rey as Sonia
Manuel Guizar as Canales
Alvaro Cerviño as Damián
Emoé de la Parra as Inés
María Prado as Violeta

References

External links

1987 telenovelas
Mexican telenovelas
1987 Mexican television series debuts
1987 Mexican television series endings
Spanish-language telenovelas
Television shows set in Mexico
Televisa telenovelas